Marcelo Adrián Mansilla Iriarte (born 10 March 1981, in Montevideo) is a Uruguayan former professional footballer who played as a midfielder.

Clubs
 Central Español 2001–2004
 Nacional 2005–2006
 Changchun Yatai 2007
 Miramar Misiones 2007–2008
 Universidad César Vallejo 2008–2009
 Cerro 2010–2011
 Liverpool 2011–2013

Honours
Nacional
Uruguayan Primera División: 2005, 2005–06

Changchun Yatai
Chinese Super League: 2007

References

External links
 

1981 births
Living people
Uruguayan footballers
Association football midfielders
Central Español players
Club Nacional de Football players
Changchun Yatai F.C. players
Miramar Misiones players
Club Deportivo Universidad César Vallejo footballers
C.A. Cerro players
Liverpool F.C. (Montevideo) players
Uruguayan expatriate footballers
Uruguayan expatriate sportspeople in China
Expatriate footballers in China
Uruguayan expatriate sportspeople in Peru
Expatriate footballers in Peru